The Downtown Ketchikan Historic District in Ketchikan, Alaska was listed on the National Register of Historic Places in 2017.

The listing was put out for comments in the Federal Register in 2016.

See also
Creek Street (Ketchikan, Alaska)
National Register of Historic Places listings in Ketchikan Gateway Borough, Alaska
Totem Heritage Center

References

National Historic Landmarks in Alaska